Malandro Records was an American record label based in Cincinnati, Ohio, which released albums by Brazilian musicians. Founded by Rick Warm, the label released about 20 albums before it ceased operation.

The label's name came from the Portuguese word malandragem, a person who lived a certain type of free lifestyle.

All About Jazz called Malandro "the leading U.S. label specializing in contemporary Brazilian music".

Discography
Recordings c. 1996 – 2001

References

American record labels
Brazilian record labels
 
Music of Cincinnati